Wall of Flowers is an album by Mike Baggetta featuring Mike Watt and Jim Keltner. The album has been described as "post-genre-improv-jazz-rock".

The album was largely improvised even though the trio of musicians had never played with each other before recording in 2017. A conversation with Chris Schlarb of Big Ego Studios led to a discussion about the David Torn album Cloud About Mercury which Baggetta admired. Baggetta learned that the artists on the album had not worked together previously and were simply "cold-called" by Torn so he jokingly suggested Schlarb call Watt and Keltner to join him for an album. Schlarb made some calls and soon Baggetta was joined by Watt and Keltner to record his Wall of Flowers.

Following the release of the album, Baggetta and Watt embarked on a ten-date March tour with Stephen Hodges substituting for Keltner. The tour resulted in the formation of mssv, a live album (Live Flowers) and a studio album scheduled for 2020 release.

Personnel
Mike Baggetta - acoustic and electric guitars, live processing
Jim Keltner - drums and percussion
Mike Watt - electric bass guitar

Production
 Engineered by Arin Mueller
 Mixed by Chris Schlarb and Devin O'Brien
 Mastered by David Torn

References

External links
Wall of Flowers on Bandcamp
baggetta + hodges + watt "wall of flowers album release tour" tour diary by Mike Watt

2019 albums
Experimental rock albums